Klopot is a Slavic toponym that may refer to:

Klopot, Podgorica, Montenegro
Kłopot, Kuyavian-Pomeranian Voivodeship, Poland
Kłopot, Lubusz Voivodeship, Poland

Slavic toponyms
Serbo-Croatian place names